Harry Shuler Dent Sr. (February 21, 1930 – October 2, 2007) was an American political strategist considered one of the architects of the Republican Southern Strategy. He was the father of the financial prognosticator, Harry S. Dent, Jr.

References

External links
 Harry S. Dent Papers at Clemson University Special Collections Library

1930 births
2007 deaths
American male journalists
20th-century American journalists
South Carolina lawyers
American political consultants
South Carolina Republicans
People from St. Matthews, South Carolina
Politicians from Columbia, South Carolina
Presbyterian College alumni
People convicted in the Watergate scandal
George Washington University Law School alumni
United States Army officers
United States Army personnel of the Korean War
Military personnel from South Carolina
Baptists from South Carolina
American philanthropists
Lawyers from Columbia, South Carolina
New Right (United States)